Choreutis nemorana, the fig-tree skeletonizer moth or fig leaf roller, is a species of moth of the  family Choreutidae.

Description
Choreutis nemorana has a wingspan of 16–20 mm. The basic color of the forewings varies from reddish brown to ocher brown, with whitish markings. The hindwings are brownish, with two pale brown dots on the edge.

Adults overwinter and appear in early spring. The larvae feed on figs. They are protected by a web of silken threads. Adults of the summer generation emerge in July. The second generation emerges in autumn and hibernate.

The species is considered a minor pest, causing distortion of the leaves and discoloration, scarring and tattering.

Distribution
This species is widespread from the Canary Islands and Madeira, through the Mediterranean Region and North Africa to Asia. In 2009, it was first recorded in Belgium. It has since established colonies in the east and is expected to spread to the west.

References

External links
Lepiforum.de

Choreutis
Moths described in 1799
Moths of Africa
Moths of Asia
Moths of Europe
Taxa named by Jacob Hübner